Zhang Xiaotian (born 26 August 1988 in China) is a Chinese baseball infielder. He was a member of the China national baseball team competing in the 2009 World Baseball Classic. He was a coach for the 2017 World Baseball Classic.

References

1988 births
Living people
Chinese baseball players
2009 World Baseball Classic players
Jiangsu Hopestars players